Fabio Casartelli (16 August 1970 – 18 July 1995) was an Italian cyclist and an Olympic gold medalist. He was killed in a crash on the descent of the Col de Portet d'Aspet, France, during the 15th stage of the 1995 Tour de France.

Amateur career
Fabio Casartelli showed great promise as an amateur. He had many important wins and placings between 1990 and 1992, climaxing in winning a gold medal in the 1992 Summer Olympics road race. He finished the 194 km race in 4:35:21, a second ahead of Erik Dekker of the Netherlands and 3 ahead of Dainis Ozols of Latvia.

Amateur victories

1990
Trofeo Sironi
1991
Monte Carlo-Alassio
Gemeli Meda
Coppa Casale
GP Capodarco di Fermo
Trofeo Cesab
1992
 Olympic Road Race Championship
Monte Carlo-Alassio
GP Diano Marina
Coppa Cigogna
Trophia de Mare

Professional career
Casartelli began his professional career in 1993 with the Ariostea team. He won a stage in the Settimana Bergamasca race, came second in a stage of the Tour de Suisse and finished the Giro d'Italia. In 1994 he moved to ZG-Mobili. For his third professional year, he moved to Team Motorola. He placed sixth in the Spanish Clásica de Almería and third in the second stage of the Spanish Tour of Murcia. Casartelli was selected to represent his team for the 1995 Tour de France along with Alvaro Mejia, Frankie Andreu, Lance Armstrong, Steve Bauer, Kaspars Ozers, Andrea Peron, Steve Swart and Sean Yates.

Professional results

1993 - Team Ariostea
Giro d'Italia: 107th overall
Settimana Bergamasca: first stage 1
Tour de Suisse: second stage 5, third stage 2
1994 - Team ZG-Mobili Bottecchia
Giro di Toscana: 15th overall
1995 - Team Motorola
Classica Costa del Almeria: sixth overall
Tour de Suisse: second stage 1
Tour of Murcia: third stage 7

Death

On 18 July, during the fifteenth stage of the 1995 Tour de France, Casartelli and a few other riders crashed on the descent of the Col de Portet d'Aspet mountain pass in the Pyrenees. Casartelli's head struck the concrete blocks along the roadway, causing severe head injuries and loss of consciousness.  Doctors arrived within ten seconds.  While being flown to a local hospital by helicopter, Casartelli stopped breathing and after numerous resuscitation attempts he was declared dead. It has been argued that Casartelli would have survived if he had been wearing a bicycle helmet. Gerard Porte, the Tour's senior doctor, claimed that protection was academic since the fatal blow was to an area of Casartelli's head that would not have been covered by a helmet.  However Michel Disteldorf, the French doctor who examined Casartelli's body on behalf of the coroner in Tarbes, where the rider was flown by helicopter after he crashed, told the Sunday Times that the point of impact was on the top of the skull, and that had Casartelli been wearing a hard helmet "some injuries could have been avoided".

His Motorola team continued the Tour de France, crossing the finish line of the next stage first, side by side in Pau. The peloton followed behind, riding slowly. The Société du Tour de France awarded the stage prizes as normal, and the riders donated all the money won that day to a fund established for his family. The Tour later matched that amount, and thousands of individuals contributed to the fund.

Three days after the accident Fabio Casartelli's teammate Lance Armstrong dedicated his stage win in Limoges to Casartelli by pointing at the sky as he rode over the finish line.

The Société du Tour de France and the Motorola team placed a memorial near where he crashed, situated at co-ordinates  (42.940, 0.819).  The memorial is a sundial arranged such that the sun's shadow highlights three dates — his birth and death and 2 August, the day he won his Olympic gold medal. The bicycle he was riding at the time of his fatal crash was placed in the chapel at the Madonna del Ghisallo, a church and museum to cyclists near his home.

In 1997, the young rider classification in the Tour de France was renamed "Souvenir Fabio Casartelli" in his honour.

References

External links
 Tour de France 1995: Crash of Fabio Casartelli (Warning - some scenes in this video may cause distress).
 
 
 
 
 
 

1970 births
1995 deaths
Italian male cyclists
Olympic cyclists of Italy
Olympic gold medalists for Italy
Cyclists at the 1992 Summer Olympics
Cyclists who died while racing
Sport deaths in France
Olympic medalists in cycling
Filmed deaths in sports
Sportspeople from Como
Medalists at the 1992 Summer Olympics
Cyclists from the Province of Como